Persatuan Sepakbola Kubu Raya (simply known as PS Kubu Raya) is an Indonesian football club based in Kubu Raya Regency, West Kalimantan. They currently compete in the Liga 3.

References

External links
 

Kubu Raya Regency
Football clubs in Indonesia
Football clubs in West Kalimantan
Association football clubs established in 2008
2008 establishments in Indonesia